The 2016 Oakland Athletics season was the 49th for the franchise in Oakland (all at Oakland Coliseum), as well as the 116th in club history. They finished the season in last place in the American League Western Division.

Regular season

American League West

American League Wild Card

Record against opponents

Game log

|- style="background:#fbb;"
| 1 || April 4 || White Sox || 3–4 || Sale (1–0) || Hill (0–1) || Robertson (1) || 35,067 || 0–1 || L1
|- style="background:#fbb;"
| 2 || April 5 || White Sox || 4–5 || Jones (1–0) || Doolittle (0–1) || Robertson (2) || 10,478 || 0–2 || L2
|- style="background:#cfc;"
| 3 || April 6 || White Sox || 2–1 || Gray (1–0) || Rodon (0–1) || Madson (1) || 16,468 || 1–2 || W1
|- style="background:#fbb;"
| 4 || April 7 || White Sox || 1–6 || Latos (1–0) || Graveman (0–1) || — || 12,577 || 1–3 || L1
|- style="background:#cfc;"
| 5 || April 8 || @ Mariners || 3–2 || Doolittle (1–1) || Cishek (0–1) || Madson (2) || 47,065 || 2–3 || W1
|- style="background:#cfc;"
| 6 || April 9 || @ Mariners || 6–1 || Hill (1–1) || Karns (0–1) || — || 36,424 || 3–3 || W2
|- style="background:#cfc;"
| 7 || April 10 || @ Mariners || 2–1 (10)  || Axford (1–0)  || Vincent (1–1)  || Doolittle (1) || 30,834  || 4–3 || W3
|- style="background:#fbb;"
| 8 || April 11 || Angels || 1–4 || Tropeano (1–0)  || Gray (1–1)  || Street (2) || 13,371 || 4–4 || L1
|- style="background:#fbb;"
| 9 || April 12 || Angels || 4–5 || Morin (1–0) || Doolittle (1–2) || Street (3) || 13,492 || 4–5 || L2
|- style="background:#fbb;"
| 10 || April 13 || Angels || 1–5 || Shoemaker (1–1) || Surkamp (0–1) || — || 11,216 || 4–6 ||L3 
|- style="background:#fbb;"
| 11 || April 15 || Royals || 2–4 || Vólquez (2–0) || Hill (1–2) || Davis (5) || 19,451 || 4–7 || L4
|- style="background:#cfc;"
| 12 || April 16 || Royals || 5–3 || Gray (2–1) || Young (0–3) || Madson (3) || 25,564 || 5–7 || W1
|- style="background:#cfc;"
| 13 || April 17 || Royals || 3–2 || Axford (2–0) || Soria (1–1) || Madson (4) || 29,668 || 6–7 || W2
|- style="background:#cfc;"
| 14 || April 19 || @ Yankees || 3–2 (11) || Rodriguez (1–0) || Barbato (1–1) || Madson (5) || 31,952 || 7–7 || W3
|- style="background:#cfc;"
| 15 || April 20 || @ Yankees || 5–2 || Graveman (1–1) || Eovaldi (0–2) || Doolittle (2) || 37,396 || 8–7 || W4
|- style="background:#cfc;"
| 16 || April 21 || @ Yankees || 7–3 || Hill (2–2) || Shreve (1–1) || Madson (6) || 33,818 || 9–7 || W5
|- style="background:#cfc;"
| 17 || April 22 || @ Blue Jays || 8–5 || Gray (3–1) || Sanchez (1–1) || Madson (7) || 34,251 || 10–7 || W6
|- style="background:#fbb;"
| 18 || April 23 || @ Blue Jays || 3–9 || Happ (3–0) || Bassitt (0–1) || — || 46,334 || 10–8 || L1
|- style="background:#fbb;"
| 19 || April 24 || @ Blue Jays || 3–6 || Hutchison (1–0) || Surkamp (0–2) || Osuna (6) || 46,300 || 10–9 || L2
|- style="background:#fbb;"
| 20 || April 25 || @ Tigers || 3–7 || Zimmermann (4–0) || Graveman (1–2) || — || 21,671 || 10–10 || L3
|- style="background:#cfc;"
| 21 || April 26 || @ Tigers || 5–1 || Hill (3–2) || Pelfrey (0–4) || — || 22,256 || 11–10 || W1
|- style="background:#fbb;"
| 22 || April 27 || @ Tigers || 4–9 || Verlander (2–2) || Gray (3–2) || — || 22,636 || 11–11 || L1
|- style="background:#fbb;"
| 23 || April 28 || @ Tigers || 3–7 || Sánchez (3–2) || Bassitt (0–2) || Rodríguez (5) || 26,200 || 11–12 ||L2 
|- style="background:#cfc;"
| 24 || April 29 || Astros || 7–4 || Madson (1–0) || Sipp (0–1) || — || 20,159 || 12–12 || W1
|- style="background:#cfc;"
| 25 || April 30 || Astros || 2–0 || Hahn (1–0) || Devenski (0–1) || Madson (8) || 23,084 || 13–12 || W2
|-

|- style="background:#fbb;"
| 26 || May 1 || Astros || 1–2 || Fister (2–3) || Hill (3–3) || Gregerson (5) || 24,135 || 13–13 || L1
|- style="background:#fbb;"
| 27 || May 2 || Mariners || 3–4 || Karns (3–1) || Graveman (1–3) || Cishek (7) || 10,535 || 13–14 || L2
|- style="background:#fbb;"
| 28 || May 3 || Mariners || 2–8 || Iwakuma (1–3) || Gray (3–3) || — || 12,584 || 13–15 || L3
|- style="background:#fbb;"
| 29 || May 4 || Mariners || 8–9 || Montgomery (1–0) || Axford (2–1) || Cishek (8) || 16,238 || 13–16 || L4
|- style="background:#bbb;"
| — || May 6 || @ Orioles || colspan="7" | Postponed (rain). To be made up as a doubleheader May 7. 
|- style="background:#cfc;"
| 30 || May 7 || @ Orioles || 8–4 || Hill (4–3) || Wright (1–3) || — || 15,110 || 14–16 || W1
|- style="background:#fbb;"
| 31 || May 7 || @ Orioles || 2–5 || Jiménez (2–3) || Hahn (1–1) || Britton (7) || 29,862 || 14–17 || L1
|- style="background:#fbb;"
| 32 || May 8 || @ Orioles || 3–11 || Tillman (4–1) || Graveman (1–4) || — || 43,690 || 14–18 || L2
|- style="background:#fbb;"
| 33 || May 9 || @ Red Sox || 7–14 || Buchholz (2–3) || Gray (3–4) || — || 35,227 || 14–19 || L3
|- style="background:#fbb;"
| 34 || May 10 || @ Red Sox || 5–13 || O'Sullivan (1–0) || Manaea (0–1) || — || 32,167 || 14–20 || L4
|- style="background:#fbb;"
| 35 || May 11 || @ Red Sox || 3–13 || Porcello (6–1) || Surkamp (0–3) || — || 33,283 || 14–21 ||L5 
|- style="background:#cfc;"
| 36 || May 13 || @ Rays || 6–3 || Hill (5–3) || Odorizzi (0–2) || Madson (9) || 14,604 || 15–21 || W1
|- style="background:#fbb;"
| 37 || May 14 || @ Rays || 0–6 || Andriese (2–0) || Graveman (1–5) || — || 28,158 || 15–22 || L1
|- style="background:#cfc;"
| 38 || May 15 || @ Rays || 7–6 || Axford (3–1) || Geltz (0–2) || Madson (10) || 19,545 || 16–22 || W1
|- style="background:#cfc;"
| 39 || May 16 || Rangers || 3–1 || Manaea (1–1) || Holland (3–3) || Madson (11) || 10,068 || 17–22 || W2
|- style="background:#cfc;"
| 40 || May 17 || Rangers || 8–5 || Madson (2–0) || Tolleson (0–2) || — || 12,718 || 18–22 || W3
|- style="background:#cfc;"
| 41 || May 18 || Rangers || 8–1 || Hill (6–3) || Perez (1–4) || — || 14,323 || 19–22 || W4
|- style="background:#fbb;"
| 42 || May 19 || Yankees || 1–4 || Nova (3–1) || Graveman (1–6) || Chapman (5) || 17,456 || 19–23 || L1
|- style="background:#fbb;"
| 43 || May 20 || Yankees || 3–8 || Sabathia (3–2) || Gray (3–5) || — || 28,235 || 19–24 || L2
|- style="background:#fbb;"
| 44 || May 21 || Yankees || 1–5 || Tanaka (2–0) || Manaea (1–2) || — || 26,356 || 19–25 || L3
|- style="background:#fbb;"
| 45 || May 22 || Yankees || 4–5 || Pineda (2–5) || Hahn (1–2) || Chapman (6) || 25,237 || 19–26 || L4
|- style="background:#cfc;"
| 46 || May 23 || @ Mariners || 5–0 || Hill (7–3) || Walker (2–4) || — || 16,370 || 20–26 || W1
|- style="background:#fbb;"
| 47 || May 24 || @ Mariners || 5–6 || Montgomery (2–0) || Madson (2–1) || — || 17,471 || 20–27 || L1
|- style="background:#fbb;"
| 48 || May 25 || @ Mariners || 3–13 || Iwakuma (3–4) || Neal (0–1) || — || 19,227 || 20–28 || L2
|- style="background:#fbb;"
| 49 || May 27 || Tigers || 1–4 || Fulmer (4–1) || Manaea (1–3) || — || 22,498 || 20–29 || L3
|- style="background:#cfc;"
| 50 || May 28 || Tigers || 12–3 || Hahn (2–2) || Saupold (1–1) || — || 24,154 || 21–29 || W1
|- style="background:#cfc;"
| 51 || May 29 || Tigers || 4–2 || Hill (8–3) || Pelfrey (0–5) || Doolittle (3) || 20,522 || 22–29 || W2
|- style="background:#cfc;"
| 52 || May 30 || Twins || 3–2 || Graveman (2–6) || Santana (1–4) || Madson (12) || 17,248 || 23–29 || W3
|- style="background:#cfc;"
| 53 || May 31 || Twins || 7–4 || Dull (1–0) || Duffey (2–4) || Axford (1) || 12,767 || 24–29 || W4
|-

|- style="background:#cfc;"
| 54 || June 1 || Twins || 5–1 || Manaea (2–3) || Dean (1–2) || — || 11,345 || 25–29 || W5
|- style="background:#fbb;"
| 55 || June 3 || @ Astros || 2–12 || Fister (5–3) || Hahn (2–3) || — || 26,458 || 25–30 || L1
|- style="background:#fbb;"
| 56 || June 4 || @ Astros || 5–6 (12) || Feldman (3–3) || Madson (2–2) || — || 37,223 || 25–31 || L2
|- style="background:#fbb;"
| 57 || June 5 || @ Astros || 2–5 || McCullers (3–1) || Dull (1–1) || Harris (1) || 30,817 || 25–32 || L3
|- style="background:#fbb;"
| 58 || June 7 || @ Brewers || 4–5 || Davies (2–4) || Manaea (2–4) || Jeffress (16) || 19,283 || 25–33 || L4
|- style="background:#fbb;"
| 59 || June 8 || @ Brewers || 0–4 || Anderson (4–6) || Hahn (2–4) || — || 18,188 || 25–34 || L5
|- style="background:#fbb;"
| 60 || June 10 || @ Reds || 1–2 || Wood (5–1) || Gray (3–6) || Cingrani (6) ||  || 25–35 || L6 
|- style="background:#fbb;"
| 61 || June 11 || @ Reds || 1–2 || Straily (4–2) || Mengden (0–1) || Ohlendorf (1) || 32,034 || 25–36 || L7 
|- style="background:#cfc;"
| 62 || June 12 || @ Reds || 6–1 || Rodriguez (2–0) || Lamb (1–4) || — || 24,880 || 26–36 || W1 
|- style="background:#cfc;"
|63||June 13||Rangers||14–5||Coulombe (1–0)||Ramos (1–3)||Neal (1)||13,453||27–36||W2
|- style="background:#fbb;"
| 64 || June 14 || Rangers || 6–10 || Perez (6–4) || Surkamp (0–4) || — || 13,101 || 27–37 || L1
|- style="background:#fbb;"
| 65 || June 15 || Rangers || 5–7 || Martinez (1–1) || Axford (3–2) || Dyson (11) || 10,115 || 27–38 || L2
|- style="background:#fbb;"
| 66 || June 16 || Rangers || 1–5 || Lewis (6–0)  || Mengden (0–2)  || — || 14,236 || 27–39 || L3 
|- style="background:#cfc;"
| 67 || June 17 || Angels || 3–2 || Madson (3–2) || Salas (3–3) || — || 24,591 || 28–39 || W1
|- style="background:#fbb;"
| 68 || June 18 || Angels || 1–7 || Lincecum (1–0) || Dull (1–2) || — || 25,078 || 28–40 || L1
|- style="background:#fbb;"
| 69 || June 19 || Angels || 0–2 || Weaver (6–6) || Surkamp (0–5) || — || 22,846 || 28–41 || L2
|- style="background:#bfb;"
| 70 || June 21 || Brewers || 5–3 || Doolittle (2–2) || Smith (1–2) || Madson (13) || 14,810 || 29–41 || W1
|- style="background:#fbb;"
| 71 || June 22 || Brewers || 2–4 || Guerra (4–1) || Mengden (0–3) || Thornburg (2) || 13,586 || 29–42 || L1
|- style="background:#bfb;"
| 72 || June 23 || @ Angels || 5–4 || Graveman (3–6) || Lincecum (1–1)  || Doolittle (4) || 36,412 || 30–42 || W1
|- style="background:#bfb;"
| 73 || June 24 || @ Angels || 7–4 || Dull (2–2) || Salas (3–4) || Madson (14) || 41,356 || 31–42 || W2
|- style="background:#bfb;"
| 74 || June 25 || @ Angels || 7–3 || Overton (1–0) || Chacín (3–6) || — || 40,643 || 32–42 || W3
|- style="background:#fbb;"
| 75 || June 26 || @ Angels || 6–7 || Street (3–1) || Hendriks (0–1) || — || 36,715 || 32–43 || L1
|- style="background:#bfb;"
| 76 || June 27 || @ Giants || 8–3 || Mengden (1–3) || Samardzija (8–5) || — || 41,442 || 33–43 || W1
|- style="background:#bfb;"
| 77 || June 28 || @ Giants || 13–11 || Neal (1–1) || López (0–2) || Madson (15) || 41,730 || 34–43 || W2
|- style="background:#bfb;"
| 78 || June 29 || Giants || 7–1 || Manaea (3–4) || Peavy (4–7) || — || 32,810 || 35–43 || W3
|- style="background:#fbb;"
| 79 || June 30 || Giants || 6–12 || Bumgarner (9–4) || Overton (1–1) || — || 36,067 || 35–44 || L1
|-

|- style="background:#fbb;"
| 80 || July 1 || Pirates || 3–7 || Locke (8–5) || Gray (3–7) || — || 15,710 || 35–45 || L2
|- style="background:#fbb;"
| 81 || July 2 || Pirates || 2–4 (10) || Nicasio (6–6) || Coulombe (1–1) || Melancon (23) || 28,846 || 35–46 || L3
|- style="background:#fbb;"
| 82 || July 3 || Pirates || 3–6 || Liriano (6–6) || Mengden (1–4) || Melancon (24) || 21,831 || 35–47 || L4
|- style="background:#bfb;"
| 83 || July 4 || @ Twins || 3–1 || Graveman (4–6) || Nolasco (3–7) || Madson (16) || 23,100 || 36–47 || W1
|- style="background:#fbb;"
| 84 || July 5 || @ Twins || 4–11 || Milone (1–2) || Manaea (3–5) || — || 16,938 || 36–48 || L1
|- style="background:#fbb;"
| 85 || July 6 || @ Twins || 0–4 || Santana (3–7) || Gray (3–8) || 0 || 27,657 || 36–49 || L2
|- style="background:#bfb;"
| 86 || July 7 || @ Astros || 3–1 || Hill (9–3) || Fister (8–6) || Madson (17) || 20,933 || 37–49 || W1
|- style="background:#fbb;"
| 87 || July 8 || @ Astros || 9–10 || Feliz (6–1) || Madson (3–3) || — || 31,438 || 37–50 || L1
|- style="background:#bfb;"
| 88 || July 9 || @ Astros || 3–2 || Graveman (5–6) || McCullers (4–3) || Dull (1) || 35.312 || 38–50 || W1
|- style="background:#fbb;"
| 89 || July 10 || @ Astros || 1–2 (10) || Harris (1–1) || Hendriks (0–2) || — || 28,119 || 38–51 || L1
|- style="text-align:center; background:#bbcaff;"
| colspan="10" | 87th All-Star Game in San Diego, California
|- style="background:#bfb;"
| 90 || July 15 || Blue Jays || 8–7 || Dull (3–2) || Cecil (0–6) || Madson (18) || 19,192 || 39–51 || W1
|- style="background:#bfb;"
| 91 || July 16 || Blue Jays || 5–4 || Gray (4–8) || Dickey (7–10) || Madson (19) || 27,510 || 40–51 || W2
|- style="background:#fbb;"
| 92 || July 17 || Blue Jays || 3–5 || Grilli (4–3) || Axford (3–3) || Osuna (6) || 21,626 || 40–52 || L1
|- style="background:#bfb;"
| 93 || July 18 || Astros || 7–4 || Graveman (6–6)  || Fiers (6–4) || Madson (20) || 10,651 || 41–52 || W1
|- style="background:#bfb;"
| 94 || July 19 || Astros || 4–3 (10) || Rzepczynski (1–0) || Neshek (2–2)  || — || 15,143 || 42–52 || W2
|- style="background:#fbb;"
| 95 || July 20 || Astros || 0–7 || Fister (10–6)|| Mengden (1–5) || — || 20,306 || 42–53 || L1
|- style="background:#fbb;"
| 96 || July 21 || Rays || 3–7 || Moore (6–7) || Gray (4–9) || Colomé (21) || 14,412 || 42–54 || L2
|- style="background:#bfb;"
| 97 || July 22 || Rays || 1–0 (13) || Axford (4–3)  || Floro (0–1) || — || 15,250 || 43–54 || W1
|- style="background:#bfb;"
| 98 || July 23 || Rays || 4–3 || Graveman (7–6)  || Colomé (1–3)  || — || 30,436 || 44–54 || W2
|- style="background:#bfb;"
| 99 || July 24 || Rays || 3–2 || Dull (4–2)  || Ramírez (7–8)  || Madson (21) || 17,642 || 45–54 || W3 
|- style="background:#fbb;"
| 100 || July 25 || @ Rangers || 6–7 || Diekman (2–3)|| Madson (3–4) || — || 27,292 || 45–55 || L1
|- style="background:#bfb;"
| 101 || July 26 || @ Rangers || 6–3 || Gray (5–9)  || Martinez (1–3) || — || 25,272  || 46–55 || W1
|- style="background:#bfb;"
| 102 || July 27 || @ Rangers || 6–4 || Dull (5–2) || Bush (3–2) || Madson (21) || 29,630 || 47–55 || W2
|- style="background:#fbb;"
| 103 || July 29 || @ Indians || 3–5 || Anderson (2–4) || Graveman (7–7) || Allen (20) || 33,134 || 47–56 || L1
|- style="background:#fbb;"
| 104 || July 30 || @ Indians || 3–6 || Tomlin (11–3) || Overton (1–2) || — || 32,850 || 47–57 || L2
|- style="background:#fbb;"
| 105 || July 31 || @ Indians || 0–8 || Kluber (10–8) || Gray (5–10) || — || 23,739 || 47–58 || L3
|-

|- style="background:#fbb;"
| 106 || August 2 || @ Angels || 4–5 || Shoemaker (6–11) || Manaea (3–6) || Bedrosian (1) || 36,052 || 47–59 || L4
|- style="background:#fbb;"
| 107 || August 3 || @ Angels || 6–8 || Morin (2–1) || Dull (5–3) || — || 37,306 || 47–60 || L5
|- style="background:#bfb;"
| 108 || August 4 || @ Angels || 8–6 (10) || Madson (4–4) || Morin (2–2)  || Dull (2) || 34,196 || 48–60 || W1
|- style="background:#fbb;"
| 109 || August 5 || Cubs || 2–7 || Lester (12–4) || Overton (1–3) || — || 25,182 || 48–61 || L1
|- style="background:#fbb;"
| 110 || August 6 || Cubs || 0–4 || Arrieta (13–5) || Gray (5–11) || — || 32,358 || 48–62 || L2
|- style="background:#fbb;"
| 111 || August 7 || Cubs || 1–3 || Hendricks (11–7) || Manaea (3–7) || Chapman (23) || 23,450 || 48–63 || L3
|- style="background:#bfb;"
| 112 || August 8 || Orioles || 3–2 || Graveman (8–7) || Gausman (3–9) || Madson (23) || 10,407 || 49–63 || W1
|- style="background:#bfb;"
| 113 || August 9 || Orioles || 2–1 || Neal (2–1) || Miley (7–10) || Madson (24) || 13,573 || 50–63 || W2
|- style="background:#bfb;"
| 114 || August 10 || Orioles || 1–0 || Detwiler (1–0) || Gallardo (4–4) || Axford (2) || 13,481 || 51–63 || W3
|- style="background:#fbb;"
| 115 || August 11 || Orioles || 6–9 || Tillman (15–4) || Triggs (0–1) || Britton (35) || 16,610 || 51–64 || L1 
|- style="background:#bfb;"
| 116 || August 12 || Mariners || 6–3 || Manaea (4–7) || Wieland (0–1) || Madson (25) || 14,073 || 52–64 || W1
|- style="background:#fbb;"
| 117 || August 13 || Mariners || 3–4 || Iwakuma (14–7) || Graveman (8–8) || Díaz (6) || 35,067 || 52–65 || L1
|- style="background:#fbb;"
| 118 || August 14 || Mariners || 4–8 || LeBlanc (2–0) || Neal (2–2) || — || 21,203 || 52–66 || L2
|- style="background:#fbb;"
| 119 || August 15 || @ Rangers || 2–5 || Pérez (8–8) || Detwiler (1–1) || Dyson (27) || 22,845 || 52–67 || L3
|- style="background:#fbb;"
| 120 || August 16 || @ Rangers || 4–5 (10) || Kela (4–1) || Axford (4–4) || — || 21,877 || 52–68 || L4
|- style="background:#fbb;"
| 121 || August 17 || @ Rangers || 2–6 || Darvish (4–3) || Manaea (4–8) || — || 26,743 || 52–69 || L5
|- style="background:#bfb;"
| 122 || August 19 || @ White Sox || 9–0 || Graveman (9–8)  || Shields (5–15) || — || 20,011  || 53–69 || W1 
|- style="background:#fbb;"
| 123 || August 20 || @ White Sox || 2–6 || Sale (15–6) || Detwiler (1–2) || Robertson (31) || 21,178 || 53–70 || L1
|- style="background:#fbb;"
| 124 || August 21 || @ White Sox || 2–4 || Quintana (10-9) || Neal (2–3) || Robertson (32) || 23,030 || 53–71 || L2
|- style="background:#fbb;"
| 125 || August 22 || Indians || 0–1 || Carrasco (9–6) || Dull (5–4) || Miller (11) || 10,114 || 53–72 || L3
|- style="background:#bfb;"
| 126 || August 23 || Indians || 9–1 || Manaea (5–8) || Salazar (11–5) || — || 13,141 || 54–72 || W1
|- style="background:#bfb;"
| 127 || August 24 || Indians || 5–1 || Graveman (10–8) || Bauer (9–6) || — || 12,795 || 55–72 || W2
|- style="background:#fbb;"
| 128 || August 26 || @ Cardinals || 1–3 || Weaver (1–1) || Detwiler (1–3) || Oh (13) || 40,221 || 55–73 || L1
|- style="background:#bfb;"
| 129 || August 27 || @ Cardinals || 3–2 || Coulombe (2–1) || Bowman (2–5) || Madson (26) || 41,607 || 56–73 || W1
|- style="background:#bfb;"
| 130 || August 28 || @ Cardinals || 7–4 || Triggs (1–1) || Garcia (10–10) || Madson (27) || 42,239 || 57–73 || W2
|- style="background:#fbb;"
| 131 || August 29 || @ Astros || 0–6 || Musgrove (2–2) || Manaea (5–9) || — || 18,613 || 57–74 || L1
|- style="background:#fbb;"
| 132 || August 30 || @ Astros || 1–3 || McHugh (9–10) || Graveman (10–9) || Giles (6) || 23,114 || 57–75 || L2
|- style="background:#fbb;"
| 133 || August 31 || @ Astros || 3–4 || Feliz (8–1) || Hendriks (0–3) || Giles (7) || 20,033 || 57–76 || L3
|-

|- style="background:#fbb;"
| 134 || September 2 || Red Sox || 2–16 || Price (14–8) || Neal (2–4) || — || 21,376 || 57–77 || L4
|- style="background:#fbb;"
| 135 || September 3 || Red Sox || 2–11 || Porcello (19–3) || Mengden (1–6) || — || 30,045 || 57–78 || L5
|- style="background:#bfb;"
| 136 || September 4 || Red Sox || 1–0 || Madson (5–4) || Kimbrel (2–4) || — || 25,139 || 58–78 || W1
|- style="background:#fbb;"
| 137 || September 5 || Angels || 7–10 || Valdez (1–1) || Alcántara (0–1) || Bailey (2) || 18,149 || 58–79 || L1
|- style="background:#bfb;"
| 138 || September 6 || Angels || 3–2 || Axford (5–4) || Nolasco (5–13) || Madson (28) || 12,298|| 59–79 || W1
|- style="background:#bfb;"
| 139 || September 7 || Angels || 4–1 || Cotton (1–0) || Meyer (0–2) || Madson (29) ||  || 60–79 || W2
|- style="background:#fbb;"
| 140 || September 9 || Mariners || 2–3 || Iwakuma (15–11) || Mengden (1–7) || Díaz (14) || 19,385 || 60–80 || L1
|- style="background:#fbb;"
| 141 || September 10 || Mariners || 3–14 || Hernández (11–5) || Graveman (10–10) || — || 18,438 || 60–81 || L2
|- style="background:#fbb;"
| 142 || September 11 || Mariners || 2–3 || Cishek (3–6) || Madson (5–5) || Díaz (15) || 13,610 || 60–82 || L3
|- style="background:#bfb;"
| 143 || September 12 || @ Royals || 16–3 || Coulombe (3–1) || Gee (6–8) || Neal (2) || 31,061 || 61–82 || W1 
|- style="background:#bfb;"
| 144 || September 13 || @ Royals || 5–4 || Axford (6–4) || Strahm (2–1) || Madson (30) || 29,523 || 62–82 || W2
|- style="background:#bfb;"
| 145 || September 14 || @ Royals || 8–0 || Manaea (6–9) || Ventura (10–11) || — || 30,006 || 63–82 || W3
|- style="background:#bfb;"
| 146 || September 15 || @ Royals || 14–5 || Mengden (2–7) || Volquez (10–11) || — || 32,176 || 64–82 || W4
|- style="background:#fbb;"
| 147 || September 16 || @ Rangers || 6–7 || Dyson (2–2)  || Madson (5–6)  || — || 30,486 || 64–83 || L1 
|- style="background:#bfb;"
| 148 || September 17 || @ Rangers || 11–2 || Alcantara (1-1) || Darvish (5-5) || — || 39,691 || 65–83 || W1
|- style="background:#bfb;"
| 149 || September 18 || @ Rangers || 5–3 || Detwiler (2-3) || Lewis (6-3) || Dull (3) || 34,224 || 66–83 || W2
|- style="background:#fbb;"
| 150 || September 19 || Astros || 2–4 || Gregerson (4-1)  || Madson (5–7)  || Giles (12) || 10,072 || 66–84 || L1 
|- style="background:#fbb;"
| 151 || September 20 || Astros || 1–2 (10) || Devenski (4-4)  || Doolittle (2-3)  || Giles (13) || 12,139 || 66–85 || L2
|- style="background:#fbb;"
| 152 || September 21 || Astros || 5–6 || McHugh (12-10)  || Mengden (2-8)  || Gregerson (15) || 11,197 || 66–86 || L3
|- style="background:#fbb;"
| 153 || September 23 || Rangers || 0–3 || Hamels (15-5)  || Graveman (10-11)  || Dyson (36) || 26,367 || 66–87 || L4
|- style="background:#fbb;"
| 154 || September 24 || Rangers || 0–5 || Darvish (6-5)  || Alcantara (1-2)  || — || 16,736 || 66–88 || L5
|- style="background:#bfb;"
| 155 || September 25 || Rangers || 7–1 ||  Cotton (2–0) ||  Lewis (6–4) || — ||  17,048 || 67–88 || W1
|- style="background:#fbb;"
| 156 || September 26 || @ Angels || 1–2 || Ramirez (3–4) || Dull (5–5)  || Bailey (6) || 29,934 || 67–89 || L1
|- style="background:#fbb;"
| 157 || September 27 || @ Angels || 1–8 || Nolasco (8–14) || Mengden (2–9) || — || 27,531 || 67–90 || L2
|- style="background:#fbb;"
| 158 || September 28 || @ Angels || 6–8 || Achter (1–0) || Detwiler (2–4) || Ramirez (2) || 32,524 || 67–91 || L3
|- style="background:#fbb;"
| 159 || September 29 || @ Mariners || 2–3 || Cishek (4–6) || Hendricks (0–4) || Díaz (18) || 19,796 || 67–92 || L4
|- style="background:#fbb;"
| 160 || September 30 || @ Mariners || 1–5 || Walker (8–11) || Alcantara (1–3) || — || 24,088 || 67–93 || L5
|-

|- style="background:#bfb;"
| 161 || October 1 || @ Mariners || 9–8 (10)|| Madson (6–7) || Díaz (0–4) || — || 29,522 || 68–93 || W1
|- style="background:#bfb;"
| 162 || October 2 || @ Mariners || 3–2 || Manaea (7–9) || Hernández (11–8) || Axford (3) || 24,856 || 69–93 || W2
|-

|-
| Legend:       = Win       = Loss       = PostponementBold = Athletics team member

Roster

Farm system

LEAGUE CHAMPIONS: Midland

References

External links

2016 Oakland Athletics season at Baseball Reference
2016 Oakland Athletics season Official Site

Oakland Athletics seasons
Oakland Athletics
2010s in Oakland, California
Oakland Athletics